The 2012 Georgetown Hoyas football team represented Georgetown University in the 2012 NCAA Division I FCS football season. They were led by seventh-year head coach Kevin Kelly and played their home games at Multi-Sport Field. They were a member of the Patriot League. They finished the season 5–6, 2–4 in Patriot League play to finish in a three-way tie for third place.

Schedule

References

Georgetown
Georgetown Hoyas football seasons
Georgetown Hoyas football